Glenn Soukesian, known professionally as Colton Ford, is an American singer, actor, and former pornographic actor. As of May 2007, he resides in New York City.

Career

Adult pornographic career
Colton Ford appeared in a dozen gay adult celebrated films. Notable performances include Conquered that earned him 2002 Grabby Awards for "Best Group Sex Scene", Gang Bang Café that nominated him for the 2003 GayVN Awards for "Best Performers" and his lead role in Colton for which he won "Gay Performer of the Year" during the 2003 GayVN Awards.

Film and television career
In his first mainstream film appearance, Ford appeared in the 2005 documentary film Naked Fame directed by Christopher Long. The film follows Ford's transition from the world of adult films to mainstream club/dance music. It was released theatrically in 2005 in the United States and Canada.

On television, Ford co-starred for three seasons on the TV series The Lair playing the role of Sheriff Trout. The series was broadcast on here! TV. He was a featured panelist on here! TV's resident chat show Threesome.

Music career
Ford became a club/dance, house music singer-songwriter and actor. He released several singles. He released his first album, Tug of War, digitally in 2008. All tracks were written and composed by Ford and DJ/producer Quentin Harris. "That's Me" featuring Cazwell was the debut single from the album. He also was part of the True Colors Tour 2008. His second album, Under the Covers, an album of cover versions was released in 2009. In 2013, he released his third album The Way I Am and in 2015 his EP Next Chapter co-written with David Barratt including 5 originals.

Ford collaborated with Frankie Knuckles, Chris Willis, Nervo, Wawa and Redtop and others. He has had several hit singles and videos, including Billboard charting, "The Way I Am", "That's Me", "Let Me Live Again" and "Losing My Religion". His cover of Stevie Wonder's "Signed, Sealed, Delivered I'm Yours" saw collaboration with Club/Dance singer-songwriter Pepper Mashay. The song peaked at No. 9 on the Hot Dance Club Play and No. 25 on the Hot Dance Singles Sales charts. Ford was featured in Cyndi Lauper's video, "Into The Nightlife" and also performed on Cyndi Lauper's 2008 True Colors Tour. Ford was named in AfterElton.com's "Top 50 Gay Male Musicians".

Theatre career
Ford made his off-Broadway debut in 2011 playing a role in the musical theatre Little House on the Ferry, a modern gay love story set in the legendary summer resort of Fire Island, New York. The play included eleven original songs, also released as an album by the original cast, and the play included cameos by many members of New York City's LGBT community. "After Hours" (Original Cast Recording) was released as a single featuring vocals by Ford. The show ran in New York November 3–20, 2011 and featured (along with Ford), Seph Stanek, Chris Van Kirk, Matt Rodriguez, Kit Balcuns and Sean Luftus.

In 2014, Ford starred in a stage production of And All The Dead, Lie Down, co-starring with Kila Packett. The play ran from May 2 to June 6, 2014, in Los Angeles and was written by Harrison David Rivers, directed by John Coppola and produced by Michael Sonntag and Kila Packett. The play was a Studio C Artists production.

Videography

Pornographic

Non-pornographic

Discography

Albums

Extended plays

Compilation albums

Singles

Theatre
2012: Little House on the Ferry
2014: And All The Dead, Lie Down

See also
 List of male performers in gay porn films

References

External links

Colton Ford Interview
Colton Ford Interview in Philadelphia (video) 

 

1962 births
Living people
20th-century American male actors
21st-century American male actors
21st-century American singers
21st-century American male singers
American actors in gay pornographic films
American house musicians
American male pop singers
American people of Armenian descent
American gay actors
American gay musicians
Gay pornographic film actors
LGBT people from California
American LGBT singers
Male actors from Pasadena, California
Pornographic film actors from California
Singers from California
20th-century American LGBT people
21st-century American LGBT people